Tubulin epsilon and delta complex 2 (TEDC2), also known as Chromosome 16 open reading frame 59 (C16orf59), is a protein that in humans is encoded by the TEDC2 gene. Its NCBI accession number is NP_079384.2.

Gene

Locus 
TEDC2 is found on chromosome 16 at location 16p13.3, or chr16:2,460,080-2,464,963 (spanning 4883 bp) on the plus strand.

Homology and Evolution

Orthologs 
TEDC2 appeared between 684-797 million years ago. Its most distant ortholog is found in Branchiostoma floridae, the Florida lancelet, which diverged from other chordates around 684 million years ago. However, the gene arose more recently than 797 million years ago, when protostomes and deuterostomes diverged, as it is not found in any invertebrates. A table showing 20 selected orthologs is below, found with NCBI BLAST.

Paralogs 
There are no other members of the TEDC2 gene family, as it has no paralogs in any living organisms.

Expression

Transcription Factors 
Conserved predicted transcription factor binding sites found in the 5' region upstream of TEDC2 are WT1, ZKSCAN3 (x2), AREB6, MZF1 (x2), ATF6, ER, and P53. This suggests that these transcription factors in particular, and especially ZKSCAN3 and MZF1 on the basis of multiple conserved binding sites, are crucial in the regulation of TEDC2. ZKSCAN3 is a transcriptional repressor of autophagy, and MZF1 is thought to play a role as a tumor suppressor and regulator of cell proliferation. These conserved MZF1 sites, along with the conserved p53 site, suggest that TEDC2 could play a role in cell proliferation and can therefore impact the genesis and development of cancer.

Localization 
TEDC2 is predicted to be localized to the nucleus and may also be present in the cytoplasm, mitochondria, peroxisomes, and extracellular space.

Expression 
It is highly expressed in the testis and EBV-transformed lymphocytes. It is also highly expressed in lymph node, fetal liver, early erythroid cell, and B-lymphoblasts. It is also seen at higher levels in both embryonic stem cells and induced pluripotent stem cells than fibroblasts. Finally, relative to other genes, TEDC2 expression significantly decreases in breast cancer cells upon estrogen starvation.

Transcript Variants 

The gene has 10 exons. The gene has 13 alternatively spliced transcripts, with 6 coding for a protein, 1 undergoing nonsense-mediated decay, and 6 being retained introns.

Protein

General Features 
TEDC2 is encoded by the TEDC2 gene with NCBI accession number NM_025108.3. The protein is 433 amino acids long with a predicted molecular weight of 46.4 kDa. There is an antibody against the protein, but a sample western blot image is not available.

Domains 
TEDC2 contains a domain of unknown function, DUF4693, which in humans spans from proteins 148-431, approximately the last two-thirds of the protein.

Secondary Structure 
Using online bioinformatics tools, TEDC2 is predicted to have many alpha helices, and it has two well-conserved predicted beta-pleated sheets near the end of the protein.

Tertiary Structure 

TEDC2 is predicted to form tertiary structure based on its alpha helices. Many of these predicted alpha helices are highly conserved in orthologs, and one example of predicted tertiary structure generated by I-TASSER is shown to the right.

Post-translational Modifications 

TEDC2 has a well conserved predicted O-GlcNAc site at S114 in humans. O-GlcNAcylated proteins are found mostly in the nucleus, sometimes also being found in the cytoplasm, and this is a dynamic modification, frequently being removed and reattached.

TEDC2 also has three conserved, predicted C-mannosylation sites. The function of C-mannosylation is still unclear, but it is the attachment of an alpha-mannose to a tryptophan.

TEDC2 also has many possible phosphorylation sites, including seven that are well-conserved. Phosphorylation is an important means of protein regulation, activation, and inactivation, so it is difficult to determine any specific function from the presence of a serine or threonine that could be phosphorylated.

Interactions

Protein-Protein Interactions 
KDM1A, a lysine-specific demethylase, was shown to be physically associated with TEDC2. TEDC2 also interacts with FEZ1, a fasciculation and elongation protein. FEZ1, or fasciculation and elongation protein 1, is necessary for axon growth but is also thought to be involved in transcriptional control.

There is also experimental evidence for TEDC2 interaction with TUBE1 and C14orf80. TUBE1, or Tubulin epsilon 1, is involved with the centrioles during cell division, and the function of C14orf80 is unknown. TEDC2 is also co-expressed with CDC45, or cell division control protein 45, which is required for initiation of chromosomal DNA replication, as well as co-expression with CDT1, a DNA replication licensing factor required for pre-replication assembly.

Function and Clinical Significance 
The function of TEDC2 is not yet known with certainty by the scientific community, but its expression profile, predicted transcription factor binding sites, and other protein-protein interactions enable some predictions. TEDC2 is localized in the nucleus and is often expressed in developing tissues such as stem cells as well as differentiated fetal tissue, so it likely plays a role in DNA replication and/or cell division. This also fits with TEDC2's predicted or known protein-protein interactions, as it may interact with proteins involved in cell division (TUBE1, CDC45, CDT1), as well as remain under transcriptional control of tumor suppressors (WT1, MZF1, P53). Additionally, given the presence of an estrogen-response element binding-site, it is possible that TEDC2 plays a role in tumor development when mutated.

References 

Proteins